Jozef Marianus "Jos" Punt (born 10 January 1946) was the Roman Catholic bishop of Haarlem-Amsterdam in the Netherlands from 2001 to 2020.

Early life
Joseph Marianus Punt was born on 10 January 1946 in Alkmaar, North Holland, Netherlands. In his years as a student of economics in Amsterdam Punt distanced himself from the Catholic religion of his youth and was more involved in esotericism, gnosticism and Rosicrucianism. Upon discovering the Bible however, he began considering a career in the priesthood. He went to the south of the country where at the time there existed the only Catholic Dutch Seminary. In 1973 he obtained a doctoral degree in economics from the University of Amsterdam.

Roman Catholic Church

In 1979 he became a priest, ordained by Bishop of Roermond Joannes Gijsen. In the Seminary he taught the Social Teachings of the Church, and he got also his PhD in that field from Augsburg University in Germany.

Pope John Paul II appointed him Auxiliary Bishop of Haarlem 1995; he was ordained by the local ordinary, bishop Henny Bomers. Punt was also appointed as apostolic administrator for the Military Ordinariate.

In 1998 Bomers died suddenly after suffering a heart attack. Punt was appointed Apostolic Administrator. On 21 July 2001 he was appointed bishop of Haarlem. He was assisted by auxiliary bishop Johannes Gerardus Maria Hendriks, who was appointed coadjutor bishop in December 2018 and succeeded him as bishop of Haarlem-Amsterdam in 1 June 2020.

Punt was the 13th bishop of the diocese, which was established in 1559. Due to the Protestant Reformation there was no bishop in Haarlem, or the Netherlands, for 300 years, until 1853.

Pope Francis accepted his resignation on 1 June 2020. He had previously announced he hoped to retire before the usual age of 75 for health reasons.

Religious views
Bishop Punt has indicated a devotion to the Blessed Virgin Mary because he took as his motto Sub tuum praesidium, the opening phrase of a Marian hymn. He supports a proposal of the Lourdes Foundation of Amstel to construct a pilgrimage church modeled on Hagia Sophia to be built in honor of Maria Vrouwe van Alle Volkeren.

References

External links

 Bisdominformatie at the website of Diocese of Haarlem-Amsterdam
 De huidige bisschop: mgr. Punt at the website of Diocese of Haarlem-Amsterdam
Bishop Joseph Maria Punt at the website Catholic-Hierarchy.org

1946 births
Living people
20th-century Roman Catholic bishops in the Netherlands
21st-century Roman Catholic bishops in the Netherlands
People from Alkmaar
Roman Catholic bishops of Haarlem-Amsterdam
University of Augsburg alumni